The Way Ahead is an album by Archie Shepp, released on Impulse! Records in 1968. The album contains tracks recorded by Shepp, trumpeter Jimmy Owens, trombonist Grachan Moncur III, pianist Walter Davis Jr., bassist Ron Carter and drummers Roy Haynes and Beaver Harris in January 1968 with two additional tracks featuring baritone saxophonist  Charles Davis, pianist Dave Burrell and bassist Walter Booker recorded in February 1969, and first released on Kwanza (1974), added to the CD release.

Reception
The AllMusic review by Thom Jurek states: "The set is a glorious stretch of the old and new, with deep blues, gospel, and plenty of guttersnipe swing in the mix."

Track listing
 "Damn If I Know (The Stroller)" (Walter Davis Jr.) - 6:16
 "Frankenstein" (Grachan Moncur III) - 13:50
 "Fiesta" (Archie Shepp) - 9:54
 "Sophisticated Lady" (Duke Ellington, Irving Mills, Mitchell Parish) - 7:08
 "New Africa" (Moncur) - 12:55 Bonus track on CD
 "Bakai" (Cal Massey) - 10:14 Bonus track on CD
Recorded at RCA Studio, NYC, January 29, 1968 (tracks 1-4) and National Recording Studios, NYC, February 26, 1969(tracks 5-6)

Personnel
Archie Shepp: tenor saxophone
Jimmy Owens: trumpet
Grachan Moncur III: trombone
Walter Davis Jr.: piano (tracks 1-4)
Ron Carter: bass (tracks 1-4)
Roy Haynes: drums (tracks 3 & 4)
Beaver Harris: drums (tracks 1 & 2; 5 & 6)
Charles Davis: baritone saxophone (track 5 & 6)
Dave Burrell: piano (tracks 5 & 6)
Walter Booker: bass (tracks 5 & 6)

References

1968 albums
Archie Shepp albums
Impulse! Records albums
Albums produced by Bob Thiele
Albums recorded at Van Gelder Studio